Favaro Veneto is an urban part of the comune (city) of Venice, in the Province of Venice, Veneto, northeastern Italy. 

It is the centre for the Favaro Veneto Municipality (Municipalità di Favaro Veneto) which covers the towns of Ca' Noghera, Ca' Solaro, Campalto, Dese and Tessera. 

The entire Municipality has 23,753 inhabitants as of 2010.

References

Frazioni of the Metropolitan City of Venice
Geography of Venice
Populated places established in 1923
1923 establishments in Italy
20th-century establishments in Venice